Arsinoe III Philopator (which means "Arsinoe the father-loving", 246 or 245 BC – 204 BC) was Queen of Ptolemaic Egypt in 220 – 204 BC. She was a daughter of Ptolemy III and Berenice II. She was the first Ptolemaic queen to bear her brother's child. Arsinoe and her spouse Ptolemy IV were loved and well respected by the Egyptian public.

Life
Between late October and early November 220 BC, she was married to her younger brother, Ptolemy IV. She took an active part in the government of the country, at least in the measure that it was tolerated by the all-powerful minister Sosibius.

In 217 BC, she accompanied Ptolemy IV along with 55,000 troops at the Battle of Raphia in Palestine against Antiochus the Great with 68,000 troops. Arsinoe may have commanded a section of the infantry phalanx. Both sides employed cavalry, elephants, and specialized troops such as archers, as well as traditional Macedonian phalanx. When the battle went poorly, she appeared before the troops and exhorted them to fight to defend their families. She also promised two minas of gold to each of them if they won the battle, which they did.

In summer, 204 BC, Ptolemy IV died. His two leading favorites, Agathocles and Sosibius, fearing that Arsinoe would secure the regency, had her murdered in a palace coup  before she heard of her husband's death, thereby securing the regency for themselves.

Issue
 Ptolemy V

Legacy
Eratosthenes wrote a manuscript called the Arsinoe, which is lost, the subject being a memoir of the queen. It is quoted by many ancient scholars.

Portraits of her likeness are also rare, but do exist in the forms of a bust of marble, and another of bronze.

References

204 BC deaths
240s BC births
3rd-century BC Pharaohs
3rd-century BC women rulers
3rd-century BC Greek people
3rd-century BC Macedonians
Ancient Egyptian women in warfare
Queens consort of the Ptolemaic dynasty
Women in Hellenistic warfare
3rd-century BC Egyptian people
Female pharaohs
3rd-century BC Egyptian women